is the 17th single by Japanese idol girl group Nogizaka46. It was released on 22 March 2017. It reached number-one on the weekly Oricon Singles Chart with 874,528 copies sold. It was also number-one on the Billboard Japan Hot 100. The song won the Grand Prix at the 59th Japan Record Awards.

Release 
This single was released in 5 versions. Type-A, Type-B, Type-C, Type-D and a regular edition.

Track listing

Type-A

Type-B

Type-C

Type-D

Regular Edition

Special Edition

Participating members 

Note: Center position of each song in bold

"Influencer" 

Performing by selected members (Senbatsu)

 Third row: Mai Shinuchi, Sayuri Inoue, Ranze Terada, Hinako Kitano, Marika Itō, Minami Hoshino, Yuri Saitō, Hina Higuchi, Kana Nakada
 Second row: Yumi Wakatsuki, Kazumi Takayama, Rina Ikoma, Erika Ikuta, Sayuri Matsumura, Reika Sakurai
 First row: Manatsu Akimoto, Miona Hori, Nanase Nishino, Mai Shiraishi, Asuka Saitō, Misa Etō

"Jinsei o Kangaetakunaru" 

Performing by Joshikō Quartet unit

 Kana Nakada, Manatsu Akimoto, Reika Sakurai, Yumi Wakatsuki

"Igai BREAK" 

Performing by Anegozaka unit

 Kazumi Takayama, Mai Shiraishi, Misa Etō, Sayuri Matsumura

"Another Ghost" 

Performing by Nasuka unit

 Asuka Saitō, Marika Itō, Nanase Nishino

"Fūsen wa Ikiteiru" 

Performing by non-selected members (Under Members)

 Ami Nōjō, Ayane Suzuki, Chiharu Saitō, Hina Kawago, Iori Sagara, Junna Itō, Karin Itō, Kotoko Sasaki, Mahiro Kawamura, Māya Wada, Miria Watanabe, Rena Yamazaki

"Sanbanme no Kaze" 

Performing by all third generation members

 Ayano Christie Yoshida, Hazuki Mukai, Kaede Satō, Minami Umezawa, Mizuki Yamashita, Momoko Ōzono, Renka Iwamoto, Reno Nakamura, Riria Itō, Shiori Kubo, Tamami Sakaguchi, Yūki Yoda

"Atarisawari no Nai Hanashi" 

Performing by Kasumi Kusa unit

 Minami Hoshino, Miona Hori, Rina Ikoma, Sayuri Inoue

Chart performance

Oricon

Billboard Japan

References

2017 singles
2017 songs
Japanese-language songs
Nogizaka46 songs
Oricon Weekly number-one singles
Billboard Japan Hot 100 number-one singles
Song articles with missing songwriters
Songs with lyrics by Yasushi Akimoto